Ilya Aleksandrovich Glebov (born 16 January 2001) is a Russian football player who plays for FC Metallurg Lipetsk.

Club career
He made his debut in the Russian Football National League for FC Metallurg Lipetsk on 31 July 2021 in a game against FC Neftekhimik Nizhnekamsk.

References

External links
 
 
 Profile by Russian Football National League

2001 births
Sportspeople from Lipetsk
Living people
Russian footballers
Association football forwards
FC Metallurg Lipetsk players
Russian First League players
Russian Second League players